The Roman Theater of Zaragoza (formerly Caesaraugusta) is a theater from the Roman era, built in the first half of the 1st century AD, in the Age of Tiberius and Claudius. It had a capacity of 6,000 spectators (in a city where only lived 18.000 people) and followed the model of  the Theatre of Marcellus in Rome. It was active until the third century. 

Its materials were used to build walls and other buildings. In 1973, archeological excavations uncovered it. It can currently be visited within the framework of the Cesaraugusta Theater Museum. It was declared Bien de Interés Cultural in 2001.

See also
 List of Roman theatres

References

Ancient Roman theatres in Spain
Buildings and structures in the Province of Zaragoza
Buildings and structures completed in the 1st century BC
Bien de Interés Cultural landmarks in the Province of Zaragoza